The Isle of Man Information Commissioner is the national data protection authority for the Isle of Man under the Data Protection Act 2002 (an Act of Tynwald).  The office was originally created as the Isle of Man Data Protection Registrar by the Data Protection Act 1986.  The present holder is Mr Iain McDonald, who is in his fourth 5-year term, having been initially appointed in January 2003.  The Office is funded by the Treasury, but is independent of the Isle of Man Government.

See also 
 Information privacy

External links
 Official website

Government of the Isle of Man